Kavacham is a 1992 Malayalam Indian film directed by K. Madhu, starring Raghuvaran in lead role. The film was much expected to succeed as since director K. Madhu teamed up with Raghuvaran, who gave a hit in Malayalam Vyooham
, but this film flopped.

Plot

Kavacham is the story of 2 friends Raghuvaran and Captain Raju, working as private detectives. Their characters was moulded in the form of Mandrake and Lothar, Mandrake's best friend and crimefighting companion, respectively.

Cast

Raghuvaran
Captain Raju
Babu Antony
Parvathy Jayaram
Mohan Raj
Janardhanan

References

External links
 

1992 films
1990s Malayalam-language films
Indian action films
Films directed by K. Madhu
1992 action films